Christmas Duets is a 2008 album released by RCA Records, consisting of archival Elvis Presley vocal recordings mixed with completely re-recorded instrumentation and new vocals by contemporary country and gospel singers. Three tracks on the album do not have duet vocals: "The First Noel", "If I Get Home On Christmas Day", and "Winter Wonderland". However, the instrumental tracks for these songs were re-recorded by contemporary musicians, just like on all other songs. The Martina McBride and Carrie Underwood duets have both charted on the Billboard country charts, with the former reaching the Top 40.

A second version of "Blue Christmas" was recorded with Martina McBride using mainly acoustic instrumentation in order to obtain a similar arrangement to the one used in the informal segments of Presley's '68 Comeback Special. Also, shots of McBride performing the song were digitally inserted into footage, taken from the original special, of Presley performing the same song, to use as a promotional music video for the album. The second version of "Blue Christmas" was never officially released outside the video.

On March 8, 2018, the album was awarded a Gold certification by the RIAA for selling in excess of 500,000 copies.

List of Songs 
Unless otherwise indicated, Information is based on Liner Notes

Notes
Tracks 1-6 & 8: Originally recorded on September 5–7, 1957 for Elvis' Christmas Album
Tracks 7 & 9-13: Originally recorded on May 15–16, 1971 for Elvis sings The Wonderful World of Christmas
The Canadian edition of the album has a duet of "On A Snowy Christmas Night", performed with Renée Martel at track 11 right before the bonus tracks as the rest of the album is in order.

Personnel  
Performance
 Elvis Presley – sampled lead vocals (All tracks)
 Eddie Bayers – drums (tracks 1-8, 10-13)
 Richard Bennett – acoustic guitar (tracks 1-2, 6)
 Eric Darken – percussion (tracks 2, 5, 7-8)
 Sara Evans - additional vocals (track 5)
 Steve Gibson – guitar (electric on tracks 1-3, 5-6, acoustic on 8, additional on 4, 11-13)
 Ginger Holliday – background vocals (tracks 7, 10-12)
 David Hungate – bass guitar (tracks 3-5, 7-8, 10-13)
 The Imperials – sampled background vocals (tracks 10-12)
 John Jarvis – piano (tracks 2, 4-6, 11-13), Hammond organ (7)
 The Jordanaires – background vocals (tracks 1-6, 8-9, 13)
 Michael Black - Jordanaires group member (track 13)
 Louis Nunley - Jordanaires group member (tracks 1-6, 8-9, 13)
 Gordon Stoker - Jordanaires group member (tracks 1-6, 8-9, 13)
 Ray Walker - Jordanaires group member (tracks 1-6, 8-9, 13)
 Curtis Young - Jordanaires group member (tracks 1-6, 8-9)
 Millie Kirkham – background vocals (tracks 1-6, 8-9, 13, sampled on 10-12)
 Jim Long – electric guitar (track 3)
 Gordon Mote – Hammond organ (tracks 1-6, 8, 11-13)
 Anne Murray - additional vocals (track 9)
 Nashville String Machine – strings (track 11)
 Olivia Newton-John - additional vocals (track 10)
 Palmetto State Quartet – background vocals (track 4)
 Brian Beatty - Palmetto State group member (track 4)
 Kerry Beatty - Palmetto State group member (track 4)
 Jeremy Calloway - Palmetto State group member (track 4)
 Larry Strickland - Palmetto State group member (track 4)
 LeAnn Rimes - additional vocals (track 3)
 Temple Riser – background vocals (tracks 7, 10-12)
 Hargus "Pig" Robbins – piano (tracks 1, 3, 8)
 Gretchen Wilson - additional vocals (track 7)
 Glenn Worf – bass guitar (tracks 1-2, 6)

Production
 Chuck Ainlay - record producer (All tracks), audio mixing (All tracks), recording engineer (1-2, 4, 6, 8, 11-13, instrumental on 3, 5, 7, 9-10)
 Eric Bates - additional vocal recording engineer (track 5)
 Jim Cooley - audio mixing assistant (All tracks), assistant recording engineer (1-6, 8-13, instruments on 7)
 Carl Gorodetzky - string contractor (track 11)
 Mike Griffith - production coordinator (All tracks)
 Larry Hamby - record producer (All tracks)
 Chris Henry - additional vocal recording engineer (track 10)
 Ann Mincieli - additional vocal recording engineer (track 3)
 Ryan Nelson - assistant recording engineer (additional vocals on track 7)
 Bart Pursley - additional vocal recording engineer (track 7)
 Bergen White – string arrangements (track 11)
 Jeff Wolpert - additional vocal recording engineer (track 9)

Chart positions

Weekly charts

Year-end charts

Singles

References 

Compilation albums published posthumously
Vocal duet albums
Christmas compilation albums
2008 Christmas albums
2008 compilation albums
Elvis Presley compilation albums
Country Christmas albums
Pop rock Christmas albums
RCA Records compilation albums
Christmas albums by American artists